Route 95, or Highway 95, may refer to routes in the following countries:


International
 European route E95

Australia
 Great Northern Highway (Western Australia)
 Fossickers Way (New South Wales)

Canada
 British Columbia Highway 95
 New Brunswick Route 95
 Winnipeg Route 95

Germany
 Bundesautobahn 95

Iran 
 Road 95

Mexico
 Mexican Federal Highway 95

New Zealand
  New Zealand State Highway 95

Saudi Arabia
Highway 95 (Abu Hadriyah Highway)

United States
 Interstate 95
 U.S. Route 95
 Alabama State Route 95
 County Route 95 (Houston County, Alabama)
 Arizona State Route 95
 Arkansas Highway 95
 California State Route 95 (1934) (former)
 Colorado State Highway 95
 Florida State Road 95
 County Road 95A (Escambia County, Florida)
 Georgia State Route 95
 Hawaii Route 95
 Illinois Route 95
 K-95 (Kansas highway)
 Kentucky Route 95
 Louisiana Highway 95
 Maine State Route 95 (former)
 Maryland Route 95 (former)
 M-95 (Michigan highway)
 Minnesota State Highway 95
 Missouri Route 95
 Nebraska Highway 95
New Jersey Route 95M
New Jersey Route 95W
 New Mexico State Road 95
 New York State Route 95
 County Route 95 (Dutchess County, New York)
 County Route 95 (Erie County, New York)
 County Route 95 (Herkimer County, New York)
 County Route 95 (Jefferson County, New York)
 County Route 95 (Onondaga County, New York)
 County Route 95 (Rensselaer County, New York)
 County Route 95 (Rockland County, New York)
 County Route 95 (Saratoga County, New York)
 County Route 95 (Steuben County, New York)
 County Route 95 (Suffolk County, New York)
 Ohio State Route 95
 Oklahoma State Highway 95
 Pennsylvania Route 95 (former)
 Rhode Island Route 95 (former)
South Carolina Highway 95 (pre-1937) (former)
 Tennessee State Route 95
 Texas State Highway 95
 Texas State Highway Spur 95
 Farm to Market Road 95
 Utah State Route 95
 Virginia State Route 95 (1933-1953) (former)
 West Virginia Route 95
 Wisconsin Highway 95
 Wyoming Highway 95

See also
A95
N95
P95